Carboxypeptidase N subunit 2 is an enzyme that in humans is encoded by the CPN2 gene.

References

External links

Further reading